Conformal may refer to:

 Conformal (software), in ASIC Software 
 Conformal coating in electronics
 Conformal cooling channel, in injection or blow moulding 
 Conformal field theory in physics, such as:
 Boundary conformal field theory
 Coset conformal field theory
 Logarithmic conformal field theory
 Rational conformal field theory
 Conformal fuel tanks on military aircraft 
 Conformal hypergraph, in mathematics
 Conformal geometry, in mathematics
 Conformal group, in mathematics
 Conformal map, in mathematics
 Conformal map projection, in cartography